Vafaei is a Persian surname. Notable people with the surname include:

Alireza Vafaei (born 1989), Iranian futsal player
Hossein Vafaei (born 1994), Iranian snooker player
Ryan "V.A.F" Vafaei (born 2003), Canadian Rapper